Saman Rural District is in the Central District of Saman County, Chaharmahal and Bakhtiari province, Iran. At the census of 2006, its population was 9,400 in 2,458 households; there were 10,085 inhabitants in 2,947 households at the following census of 2011; and in the most recent census of 2016, the population of the rural district was 5,473 in 1,729 households. The largest of its eight villages was Shurab-e Saghir, with 3,294 people.

References 

Saman County

Rural Districts of Chaharmahal and Bakhtiari Province

Populated places in Chaharmahal and Bakhtiari Province

Populated places in Saman County